Legacies is an American fantasy drama television series, created by Julie Plec, that premiered on The CW on October 25, 2018. A spinoff of The Originals, it is part of The Vampire Diaries Universe, and features characters from both that series and its predecessor, The Vampire Diaries. Danielle Rose Russell stars as the 17-year-old Hope Mikaelson, continuing the role she originated in the fifth and final season of The Originals. Matt Davis also features prominently in the series, reprising his role as Alaric Saltzman from The Vampire Diaries. In May 2022, it was announced that the fourth season would be its final season.

Premise
Legacies follows Hope Mikaelson, the daughter of Klaus Mikaelson and Hayley Marshall, who is descended from some of the most powerful vampire, werewolf, and witch bloodlines. Two years after the events of The Originals, 17-year-old Hope attends the Salvatore School for the Young and Gifted. The school provides a haven where supernatural beings can learn to control their abilities and impulses.

Episodes

Cast and characters

Main
 Danielle Rose Russell as Hope Mikaelson: a teenaged orphan and student at the Salvatore School for the Young and Gifted who is descended from some of the most powerful vampire, werewolf, and witch bloodlines via her parents, Klaus Mikaelson and Hayley Marshall making her the first Tribrid. The character was first introduced in The Originals.
 Aria Shahghasemi as Landon Kirby: Rafael's foster brother and friend/romantic interest of Hope who eventually becomes her boyfriend and fellow student at the Salvatore School. Initially thought to be a human, he is then suspected of being a supernatural being after Vampire powers do not work on him like compulsion, and is later revealed to be a phoenix. The character was first introduced in The Originals season 5.
 Kaylee Bryant as Josie Saltzman (seasons 1–4): a witch and student at the Salvatore School. She is Alaric's 15-year-old daughter, Lizzie's twin, and was named after her biological mother, Josette "Jo" Laughlin of the powerful Gemini coven. Josie is deferential to her sister, Lizzie, and lacks self-confidence. Bryant departs the show midway through season 4. The character was first introduced in The Vampire Diaries as a baby and toddler and then a young teen in The Originals.
 Jenny Boyd as Lizzie Saltzman: a witch and student at the Salvatore School. She is Alaric's 15-year-old daughter, Josie's twin, and was named after Elizabeth Forbes, the late mother of the twins' surrogate mother, Caroline Forbes. Lizzie is narcissistic and is prone to emotional meltdowns. The character was first introduced in The Vampire Diaries as a baby and toddler and then a young teen in The Originals.
 Quincy Fouse as MG: A good-natured vampire who works as Alaric's student aide and is friendly with the Saltzman twins and romantically interested in Lizzie. He later briefly dates Kaleb's sister in season 2 but continues to love Lizzie.
 Peyton Alex Smith as Rafael (seasons 1–3; special guest star season 4): a recently triggered werewolf and Landon's foster brother. After suffering an abusive childhood in the foster system, he becomes a student at the Salvatore School.
 Matt Davis as Alaric Saltzman: Josie and Lizzie's father and the human headmaster of the Salvatore School. Davis described Alaric's role in the series as "somewhere between Professor X and Dumbledore". The character was first introduced in The Vampire Diaries.
 Chris Lee as Kaleb (seasons 2–4; recurring, seasons 1–2): a vampire student who is revealed to be drinking the blood of humans, a practice that is banned at the school
 Ben Levin as Jed (seasons 3–4; recurring, seasons 1–2): the hot-headed and violent alpha werewolf at the school, who is soon replaced as alpha by Rafael. He later becomes friends with the others and Rafael and stops his violence. 
 Leo Howard as Ethan (seasons 3–4; guest, season 2): a student at Mystic Falls High School and Sheriff Mac's son. He becomes friends with MG and romantically interested in Lizzie which causes tension between him and MG.
 Omono Okojie as Cleo (season 4; recurring, seasons 3–4): a witch and a new student at the Salvatore School who becomes Hope's roommate. She is later revealed to have been a slave of Malivore and a muse. She joins the super squad aiding in their fight against Malivore.

Recurring

 Demetrius Bridges as Dorian Williams: the librarian at the Salvatore School. The character was first introduced in The Vampire Diaries.
 Lulu Antariksa as Penelope Park (season 1): a witch and Josie's ex-girlfriend who despises Lizzie. Penelope leaves the Salvatore School to go to school in Europe near the end of the first season.
 Karen David as Emma Tig: a witch and the school's guidance counselor. She takes an indefinite leave-of-absence from the Salvatore School near the end of the first season. She returns later in the second season, ultimately leaving with Dorian. She returns to Mystic Falls with Dorian in the third season.
 Ben Geurens as the Necromancer: one of the creatures from Malivore who has the power to bring back the dead; before he was the Necromancer, he was a man named Ted.
 Nick Fink as Ryan Clarke: a seemingly good-natured agent working for Triad Industries, he is later revealed to have sinister motives and a connection to both Malivore and Landon
 Elijah B. Moore as Wade (season 4; co-starring, seasons 2–4): A student at the Salvatore School who was initially believed to be a witch but is later revealed to be a fairy
 Ebboney Wilson as Kym (season 2): Kaleb's human sister with whom MG begins a relationship
 Bianca Kajlich as Sheriff Mac (season 2–3): the new sheriff in Mystic Falls, as she has taken over the job from Matt Donovan when the latter is elected mayor. She is also Ethan and Maya's mother. She leaves town with Maya, and relocates to Florida, after Alaric allows her to maintain her memories of the supernatural nature of Mystic Falls in the third season.
 Bianca Santos, as Maya (season 2; guest, season 4): a student at Mystic Falls High School who is Sheriff Mac's daughter and Ethan's sister
 Alexis Denisof as Professor Vardemus (season 2; guest, season 4): the temporarily new headmaster of the Salvatore School, before the position is given back to Alaric. He remains at the school as a teacher, until leaving after the second season.
 Thomas Doherty as Sebastian (season 2): an over-600-year-old vampire who died as a teen, and who appears at the Salvatore School and starts a relationship with Lizzie Saltzman
 Olivia Liang as Alyssa Chang (seasons 2–3): a student witch at the Salvatore School who likes to instigate drama among her peers, and who ends up as Hope's roommate when Hope returns to school. She later leaves the school after causing relationship drama with MG and Jed.
 Charles Jazz Terrier as Chad (seasons 2–3): a follower of and servant to the Necromancer
 Giorgia Whigham as Jade (seasons 2–3): a vampire who turned off her humanity after accidentally killing a friend years prior. As a result, she and several others are banished to a prison world. She leaves the Salvatore School in the third season due to continuing painful memories upon her return to the Salvatore School from the prison world.
 Courtney Bandeko as Finch (season 3–4): a student at Mystic Falls High School in whom Josie takes a romantic interest. She is later revealed to be a werewolf and she transfers to the Salvatore School.
 Zane Phillips as Ben (season 4), a young man also known as Prometheus who has a strange effect on Kaleb and other monsters
 Piper Curda as Jen (season 4), a student in Vardemus' college class, who is revealed to be god known as Vulkan or Hephaestus
 Luke Mitchell as Ken (season 4), the King of the Gods who has been put in stasis by Jen, and whose past actions indicate that he would be dangerous to the world if ever released

Special guest stars
 Zach Roerig as Matt Donovan (in "This Is the Part Where You Run", "Hope Is Not the Goal"): the town's sheriff. The character was first introduced in The Vampire Diaries.
 Steven R. McQueen as Jeremy Gilbert (in "We're Being Punked, Pedro"): Alaric's old friend who saves Rafael and Landon from a werewolf hunter. The character was first introduced in The Vampire Diaries.
 Riley Voelkel as Freya Mikaelson (in "That's Nothing I Had to Remember", "We All Knew This Day Was Coming", and "Everything That Can Be Lost May Also Be Found"): One of Hope's aunts and a powerful witch. The character was first introduced in The Originals. 
 Chris Wood as Kai Parker (in "Kai Parker Screwed Us", "You Can't Save Them All"): Josie and Lizzie's evil maternal uncle. The character was first introduced in The Vampire Diaries.
 Claire Holt as Rebekah Mikaelson (in "I Thought You'd Be Happier to See Me", "Everything That Can Be Lost May Also Be Found"): One of Hope's aunts and one of the Original vampires. The character was first introduced in The Vampire Diaries.
 Rebecca Breeds as Aurora de Martel (recurring, season 4): An ancient vampire who was Rebekah's first sire, Aurora was romantically involved with Klaus in the past. She was desiccated in the third season of The Originals, where the character was first introduced.
 Charles Michael Davis as Marcel Gerard (in "Everything That Can Be Lost May Also Be Found"): Rebekah's husband and Hope's uncle, Marcel was first turned into a vampire years before by Klaus and became part of the family. The character was first introduced in The Vampire Diaries.
 Nathaniel Buzolic as Kol Mikaelson (in "Everything That Can Be Lost May Also Be Found"): Hope's uncle and one of the Original vampires. The character was first introduced in The Vampire Diaries.
 Candice King as Caroline Forbes (in "Just Don't Be A Stranger, Okay?"): Lizzie and Josie's mother and the founder of the Salvatore School. The character was first introduced in The Vampire Diaries.
 Joseph Morgan as Klaus Mikaelson (in "Just Don't Be A Stranger, Okay?"): Hope's father and a member of the Mikaelson family. The character was first introduced in The Vampire Diaries.

Notable guest stars
 Jodi Lyn O'Keefe as Jo Laughlin (in "Mombie Dearest"): Alaric's deceased ex-fiancée, and Josie and Lizzie's biological mother. The character was first introduced in The Vampire Diaries.
 Ayelet Zurer as Seylah Chelon (in "Maybe I Should Start from the End", "I Wouldn't Be Standing Here If It Weren't For You"): Landon's mother, who abandoned him at birth
 Jedidiah Goodacre as Roman (in "Let's Just Finish the Dance", "I'll Tell You a Story"): Hope's former boyfriend who was involved in the death of her mother. The character was first introduced in The Originals.
 Summer Fontana as young Hope Marshall (in "A New Hope", "I Thought You'd Be Happier to See Me"): A younger Hope, from when Lizzie and Josie were 11 years old; Fontana first played Hope in The Originals.

Production

Development
In August 2017, it was announced that early discussions on the development of a spinoff of The Originals focusing on Hope Mikaelson, the daughter of Klaus Mikaelson and Hayley Marshall, were taking place with Julie Plec, creator of The Originals and co-creator of The Vampire Diaries. In January 2018, it was revealed that a pilot for the spinoff had been ordered; Plec penned the pilot script and is credited with creating the series. It was announced in March 2018 that the spinoff had been ordered to pilot, but instead of a traditional pilot, a fifteen-minute pilot presentation of the series would be presented to The CW.

On May 11, 2018, it was announced that the spinoff, titled Legacies, had been ordered to series for the 2018–19 U.S. television season. In June 2018, it was announced that the series would premiere on October 25, 2018. On October 8, 2018, The CW announced that they had ordered three additional scripts for the series, bringing the first season total script order to sixteen episodes.

On January 31, 2019, The CW renewed the series for a second season. The second season premiered on October 10, 2019. On January 7, 2020, the series was renewed for a third season, which premiered on January 21, 2021. On February 3, 2021, the series was renewed for a fourth season which premiered on October 14, 2021. On May 12, 2022, it was reported that the fourth season would be the last season.

Filming
In March 2020, production on the second season was shut down as a result of the COVID-19 pandemic. Only 16 of the ordered 20 episodes had been completed. On March 26, 2020, it was announced that the sixteenth episode that aired that same night would serve as a spring finale as the production team had run out of episodes to air following the production shut down. Filming on the third season began on October 15, 2020. Production on the third season finished on June 24, 2021. Twenty episodes for the season were filmed, but the remaining four were held for the fourth season. Filming on the fourth season concluded on April 27, 2022.

Casting
It was announced in March 2018 that The Vampire Diaries veteran Matt Davis would reprise the role of Alaric Saltzman and that Danielle Rose Russell would star as Hope Mikaelson. Quincy Fouse, Jenny Boyd, Kaylee Bryant, and Aria Shahghasemi were also set to star. Shahghasemi would debut in the twelfth episode of the fifth season of The Originals as Hope's friend Landon. It was revealed at San Diego Comic-Con in July 2018 that Paul Wesley would direct an episode and that Zach Roerig would appear in the series. Steven R. McQueen was revealed to be reprising his role as Jeremy Gilbert in the series' third episode.

In July 2019, it was announced that Thomas Doherty would appear in the second season and that Alexis Denisof would recur in the second season as Professor Vardemus. In August 2019, Bianca Santos, Bianca Kajlich, and Leo Howard were cast in recurring roles for the second season. In September 2019, it was reported that Riley Voelkel would reprise her role as Freya Mikaelson for the sixth episode of the second season. In November 2019, it was announced that Chris Wood would reprise his role of Kai Parker in the twelfth episode of the second season. The same month, it was reported that Chris Lee had been promoted to a series regular during production on the second season and that Olivia Liang had been cast in a recurring role for the second season. On January 20, 2020, Charles Jazz Terrier was cast in a recurring capacity.

In September 2020, it was announced that Leo Howard and Ben Levin had been promoted to series regulars for the third season. On January 27, 2021, Omono Okojie was cast in a recurring role for the third season. The same month, it was revealed that Peyton Alex Smith was leaving the regular cast. Candice King performed an uncredited voiceover as Lizzie and Josie's mother, Caroline Forbes from The Vampire Diaries, in the third-season episode "Salvatore: The Musical!"

On August 27, 2021, it was reported that Okojie had been promoted to a series regular for the fourth season. Claire Holt reprised her role as Rebekah Mikaelson for the fifth episode of the fourth season. In December 2021, Zane Phillips joined the cast in a recurring capacity for the fourth season. In December 2021, Kaylee Bryant left the series in the ninth episode of the fourth season. In February 2022, Piper Curda was cast in a recurring role for the fourth season. In March 2022, Charles Michael Davis and Nathaniel Buzolic were set to reprise their roles as Marcel Gerard and Kol Mikaelson for the April 14, 2022, episode of the fourth season.
In April 2022, it was announced that Luke Mitchell was joining the fourth season in a recurring role. In June 2022, it was announced that Joseph Morgan would reprise his role as Klaus Mikaelson in the series finale.

Broadcast
The first season of Legacies premiered on October 25, 2018 and concluded on March 28, 2019, on The CW. The second season debuted on October 10, 2019 and finished on March 26, 2020. The third season premiered on January 21, 2021 and concluded on June 24, 2021. The fourth season premiered on October 14, 2021.

Home media
A manufacture-on-demand DVD for the first season was released by the Warner Archive Collection on October 22, 2019.

Reception

Critical response
On the review aggregator website Rotten Tomatoes, the series has an approval rating of 82% based on 11 reviews, with an average rating of 8.0 out of 10. The website's critic consensus states: "A fun and fast-paced addition to The CW's stable of supernatural high school series, Legacies emerges from the shadows of its sister shows an unexpected delight." Metacritic, which uses a weighted average, assigned a score of 59 out of 100 based on 5 critics, indicating "mixed or average reviews".

Ratings

Notes

References

External links
 

2018 American television series debuts
2022 American television series endings
2010s American drama television series
2020s American drama television series
American television spin-offs
The CW original programming
English-language television shows
Television productions suspended due to the COVID-19 pandemic
Television series by Alloy Entertainment
Television series by CBS Studios
Television series by Warner Bros. Television Studios
The Vampire Diaries